"Even Then" is a song by American Christian musician artist Micah Tyler. The song was released as the third single from his 2017 album Different on June 1, 2018. The song peaked at No. 6 on the US Hot Christian Songs chart, becoming his third top 10 single from that chart. It lasted 34 weeks on the overall chart. The song is played in a F# minor key, and 75 beats per minute.

Track listing
CD release
"Even Then" – 3:16
"Even Then(Lead Sheet (Medium Key)" – 3:16
"Even Then(Vocal Demonstration)" – 3:14
"Even Then(High Key With Background Vocals)" – 3:14
"Even Then(High Key Without Background Vocals)" – 3:14
"Even Then(Medium Key With Background Vocals)" – 3:14
"Even Then(Medium Key Without Background Vocals)" – 3:14
"Even Then(Low Key With Background Vocals)" – 3:14
"Even Then(Low Key Without Background Vocals)" – 3:14

Charts

Weekly charts

Year-end charts

References

2017 songs
2018 singles